McGinty is a surname of Irish origin.

McGinty may also refer to:
 McGinty (horse), a New Zealand racehorse
 McGinty's Department Store in Neosho, Missouri; defunct
 McGinty Mountain, in San Diego County, California
 , a destroyer escort of the US Navy

Popular culture

Mrs McGinty's Dead, a novel by Agatha Christie

"Down Went McGinty", 1889 song by Joseph Flynn

"Paddy McGinty's Goat", 1917 song by Bert Lee and R. P. Weston with the Two Bobs

The Great McGinty, 1940 film directed by Preston Sturges, based on the 1889 song

Arthur Ransome's children's novel characters Mrs McGinty in Coot Club and Scottish landholder The McGinty in Great Northern?